Tucurrique is a district of the Jiménez canton, in the Cartago province of Costa Rica.

History 
Tucurrique was created on 19 April 1911 by Decreto Ejecutivo 12. Segregated from Paraíso canton.

Geography 
Tucurrique has an area of  km² and an elevation of  metres.

Demographics 

For the 2011 census, Tucurrique had a population of  inhabitants.

Transportation

Road transportation 
The district is covered by the following road routes:
 National Route 225

References 

Districts of Cartago Province
Populated places in Cartago Province